Pure Cult: The Singles 1984–1995 is a singles compilation by The Cult, authorized by the band to replace the previous unauthorized High Octane Cult. It is also a reissue of the 1993 compilation Pure Cult: for Rockers, Ravers, Lovers, and Sinners, with minor changes.

Track listing
All songs written by Ian Astbury and Billy Duffy except "In the Clouds", which was written by Astbury, Duffy and Craig Adams.

"She Sells Sanctuary" - 4:12
"Fire Woman" - 5:07
"Lil' Devil" - 2:44
"Spiritwalker" - 3:11*
"The Witch" - 4:17*
"Revolution" - 4:16*
"Love Removal Machine" - 4:17
"Rain" - 3:54
"In the Clouds" - 3:59
"Coming Down (Drug Tongue)" - 4:01*
"Edie (Ciao Baby)" - 3:59*
"Heart of Soul" - 4:30*
"Wild Flower" - 3:37
"Star" - 3:59*
"Resurrection Joe" - 4:18
"Go West" - 3:56
"Sun King" - 4:55*
"Wild Hearted Son" - 4:24*
"Sweet Soul Sister" (video version) - 3:29*

Songs with (*) are single edits, rather than album versions.
Tracks 4, 16 taken from Dreamtime.
Tracks 1, 6, 8 taken from Love.
Tracks 3, 7, 13 taken from Electric.
Tracks 2, 11, 17, 19 taken from Sonic Temple.
Tracks 12, 18 taken from Ceremony.
Track 5 taken from Songs from the Cool World.
Tracks 10, 14 taken from The Cult.
Track 9 taken from High Octane Cult.

Personnel
Ian Astbury - vocals, tracks 1-19
Billy Duffy - guitar, tracks 1- 19
Jamie Stewart - bass, tracks 1–4, 6- 8, 11, 13, 15–17, 19
Nigel Preston - drums, tracks 1, 4, 15-16
Mark Brzezicki - drums, tracks 6, 8
Les Warner – drums, tracks 3, 7, 13
Mickey Curry – drums, tracks 2, 5, 11–12, 17-19
John Webster – keyboards, tracks 2, 11
Bob Buckley – string arrangement, track 11
 Charley Drayton - bass, tracks 5, 12, 18
 Suzie Katayama - cello, tracks 12, 18
 Benmont Tench - organ, tracks 5, 12
 Scott Thurston - synthesizer track 5
 Richie Zito - keyboards, track 12
Craig Adams – bass, tracks 9–10, 14
Scott Garrett – drums, tracks 9–10, 14
Scott Humphrey – keyboards, tracks 9–10, 14

Certifications

References

The Cult albums
2000 compilation albums
Beggars Banquet Records compilation albums